The Austere Academy is the fifth novel in the children's novel series A Series of Unfortunate Events by Lemony Snicket. The Baudelaire orphans are sent to a boarding school, overseen by monstrous employees. There, the orphans meet new friends, new enemies, and Count Olaf in disguises.

It was released in 2000 in the US, and 2001 in the UK, despite The Miserable Mill (the fourth book) being released in 2002.

Plot summary
Mr. Poe drops the Baudelaire children—Violet, Klaus and Sunny—off at Prufrock Preparatory School, a boarding school they are to attend. They are greeted by a rude girl, Carmelita Spats, who calls the children "cakesniffers". Vice Principal Nero tells them about the school's odd rules: they are to sleep in a crab-infested, fungus-dripping shack because they have no living guardian to sign a permission slip for them. Sunny will work as Nero's administrative assistant. They must attend nightly concerts at which Nero performs terribly on the violin. Punishments for rule-breaking include having silverware removed or hands tied while eating in the cafeteria, or having to purchase candy for Nero. Sunny will have her silverware removed permanently for working in the administrative building, which children are not allowed in.

At lunch, Carmelita mocks the Baudelaires, but Duncan and Isadora Quagmire stand up for them. The Quagmires are triplets, and they say that their parents died in a fire that also killed their sibling Quigley. When they become adults, they will inherit a fortune of sapphires. Isadora writes rhyming couplets, while Duncan is passionate about journalism and researching. Over the following days, Violet is a student of Mr. Remora, and must take detailed notes of his boring anecdotes, while Klaus is taught by Mrs. Bass, who makes her students endlessly measure the dimensions of objects. Isadora is in Klaus' class and Duncan is in Violet's. Sunny struggles to carry out her administrative work, which is designed for an adult. The school has no weekend breaks.

Count Olaf soon arrives, disguised as the new gym teacher Coach Genghis. Nero fails to recognize him, or to take the children seriously when they raise concerns—particularly as he arrives during their meeting. Carmelita delivers a message to the Baudelaires that they are to meet Genghis after dinner, where he makes them run laps all night while painting a large, luminous circle on the lawn. He calls this "Special Orphan Running Exercises", abbreviated "S.O.R.E." The children pretend not to recognize Olaf. After nine consecutive nights of S.O.R.E., Violet and Klaus begin failing tests in class, Sunny fails to complete administrative work and they begin arguing with Duncan and Isadora.

The Baudelaires meet with Nero and tell him directly that Genghis is Olaf, but he is disbelieving. He demands that Violet and Klaus take comprehensive tests set by their teachers the following morning, while Sunny must prepare homemade staples to use on Nero's paperwork, or they will be expelled and fired. Genghis has offered to act as the children's guardian in this case. They must also give Carmelita earrings for each delivered message, and present Nero with candy for missing his concerts while doing S.O.R.E.

Duncan and Isadora disguise themselves as Violet and Klaus and steal a bag of flour from the cafeteria to pose as Sunny for the S.O.R.E. exercises that night. They hope Olaf will not notice the difference in the dark. The Quagmires leave their comprehensive notebooks for Violet and Klaus to learn from, while Violet invents a staple-making technique with a crab, a potato, metal rods, creamed spinach and a fork. Violet makes staples while Klaus reads from each notebook aloud.

After the children perform perfectly on their tests, Genghis arrives. He discovered that the Quagmires were impersonating the children after they left the bag of flour behind. Nero expels the Baudelaires as Mr. Poe arrives, to give Nero and Carmelita their candy and earrings. The Baudelaires insist that Genghis remove his shoes and turban, to expose Olaf's distinctive eye tattoo and monobrow, and he chooses instead to run away. The Baudelaires pursue, succeeding in removing his shoes and turban. They discover that two members of his troupe, the white-faced women, were cafeteria workers, and that Olaf has taken the Quagmires hostage. As Klaus and Olaf reaches the car, Duncan yells at Klaus, trying to communicate information he and his sister found in the library while researching Count Olaf. Duncan throws the pair's personal commonplace books at him and shouts out "V.F.D.", but Olaf kicks Klaus and snatches the notebooks up. Olaf reaches the car before the children and drives away with the white-faced women and the Quagmire children.

Foreshadowing
The last picture of The Austere Academy shows the Quagmires being shoved into a car with a fish on the license plate, which is a reference to the ocean-themed décor in The Ersatz Elevator.

Cultural references

The names Isadora and Duncan came from Isadora Duncan, a famous dancer, who was killed when her scarf was caught in a sports car's wheels.
Prufrock may be a reference to "The Love Song of J. Alfred Prufrock", a poem by T. S. Eliot.
Vice Principal Nero is a reference to the Emperor Nero, a Roman Emperor whose reign is often associated with tyranny and greed. Emperor Nero allegedly "fiddled while Rome burned." Emperor Nero was also famous for forcing many of his subjects to sit through extended theatrical pieces created and performed by himself. This is reflected in Vice Principal Nero's awful violin recitals.
Genghis Khan, a famous Mongolian chieftain, shares his name with Coach Genghis, Count Olaf's disguise in this book.
Mrs. Bass and Mr. Remora share their names with types of fish, as did the former gym teacher Miss Tench.
When Isadora mentions she writes poetry, Sunny shrieks Sappho (the name of a female Greek poet).
The book's cover is a reference to the classic novel Oliver Twist.
The UK version of the book cover is completely different. It shows Carmelita Spats glaring at Violet, Klaus and Sunny while they are getting their food.

Special editions

The Austere Academy: or, Kidnapping!
The Austere Academy; or, Kidnapping! was set to be a paperback release of The Austere Academy, designed to mimic Victorian penny dreadfuls. The book was set to include approximately seven new illustrations, and the fifth part of a serial supplement entitled The Cornucopian Cavalcade, which was to include a 13-part comic by Michael Kupperman entitled The Spoily Brats, and an advice column written by Lemony Snicket, along with other additions. However, for unknown reasons, this edition was never released.

Audio book

An audio book of this novel was released. It was the last audio book that was read by the author, Daniel Handler, under the pseudonym of Lemony Snicket. All the succeeding audio books are read by Tim Curry.

Translations
 Brazilian Portuguese: "" (Hell in the Boarding School), Cia. das Letras, 2000, 
 Finnish: "" (A Weird School), WSOY, 2004, 
 French: "" (Trap at School)
 Greek: "Η Άτεγκτη Ακαδημία" (The Inexorable Academy)
 Italian: "L'Atroce Accademia" ( The Atrocious Academy )
 Persian:  "مدرسه سخت‌گیر" (The Strict School)
 Korean: "" (The School of Fear), Munhakdongnae Publishing Co, Ltd., 2004, 
 Japanese: "" (The Punishing Boarding School), Soshisha, 2002, 
 Norwegian: Den skrekkelige skolen (The Terrible School), Karoline Melli, Cappelen Damm, 2002, 
 Russian: "" (Bigoted Boardinghouse), Azbuka, 2004, 
 Spanish: "" (A Very Austere Academy)
 Turkish:  "Katı Kurallar Okulu" (School of Strict Rules)
 Polish : "Akademia antypatii" (The Academy of Antipathy)
 Thai: "โรงเรียนสั่นประสาท", Nanmeebooks Teen, 2003,

Adaptations
The opening of the novel was partially adapted during the closing moments of the first season of the television series adaptation by Netflix, with the remaining plot was adapted as the first and second episodes of the second season.

See also

Violet Baudelaire
Klaus Baudelaire
Sunny Baudelaire
Count Olaf
Lemony Snicket
Arthur Poe
Quagmire triplets
Nero (A Series of Unfortunate Events)

References

American children's novels
2000 American novels
Books in A Series of Unfortunate Events
HarperCollins books
Novels set in boarding schools
Sequel novels
2000 children's books
American novels adapted into television shows